"Warrior" (Korean: 워리어) is a song recorded by the South Korean boy group B.A.P. It was released as a digital single on January 26, 2012, by TS Entertainment. The song was B.A.P's first single and the first from their first EP, Warrior. "Warrior" was written and produced by Kang Ji-on and Kim Ki-bum, the same producers of Song Ji-eun's "Going Crazy" and Bang & Zelo's "Never Give Up". B.A.P's leader, Bang Yong-guk, co-wrote "Warrior". The song's lyrics describe the injustice of current society and the protagonist's desire to end it.

The choreography of "Warrior" was created by Park Sang-hyun who also choreographed Secret's "Magic", "Shy Boy" and "Starlight Moonlight". The song's music video was directed by Hong Won-ki. "Warrior" was lauded by various media outlets and netizens for its powerful and fierce imagery on its music video and live performances.

Background and release

On January 8, 2011, B.A.P aired its fictional documentary show entitled Ta-Dah It's B.A.P on SBS MTV. The documentary is based on the story of how six alien beings (B.A.P), who decide to become singers in order to dominate Earth, deal with adapting the life of a K-Pop idol. Early episodes of the show featured behind the scenes footage of B.A.P's recording session and music video set of "Warrior". On January 18, 2012, TS Entertainment announced that "Warrior" will be the name of their debut song. On January 19, 2012, TS Entertainment released the music video teaser for "Warrior". TS Entertainment wanted to debut B.A.P with a different musical direction unlike the "typical boy band route", thus coming up with the idea of dealing with the "heavy issues of our society". On March 26, 2012, B.A.P officially released "Warrior" on various online music sites. A representative from TS Entertainment described "Warrior" as "a feast of splendid and grand sound combined with heart-throbbing rap and vocals".

Composition and theme

"Warrior" is the title track of B.A.P's first mini-album of the same name. "Warrior" is an uptempo hip hop song that runs for 3:29 (3 minutes, 29 seconds). The song was written and produced by Kang Ji-won and Kim Ki-bum, the same producers of Song Ji-eun's "Going Crazy" and Bang & Zelo's "Never Give Up". Additionally, B.A.P's leader, Bang Yong-guk co-wrote "Warrior". The song's lyrics describes the injustice of the current society and the protagonist's desire to end it. Kaylin Ro of Arirang Pop's in Seouls described "Warrior" "as a song in a new genre that blends the elements of krump and rock with an intense hip hop beat." Ro added that "it contains a powerful message, speaking on behalf of those who face numerous challenges in their daily lives, and the spectacular performance on stage is definitely eye-catching.

Image concept
The members  all dyed their hair platinum blonde. They personally participated in their stage ensembles, their concept, as well as writing and producing their songs on the album in order to express their unique colors. Through OSEN, member Yoo Youngjae commented, "I like the platinum blonde look. All six of us are really unique, and we wanted to prevent ourselves from being too different, because we wanted a ‘team’ image on stage. Our company listens to our opinions, and Yong Guk hyung who wrote all the songs on our album is really serious and determined, as are the rest of us."

Critical reception

Tina Xu of MTV Korea commented, "'Warrior' features a gritty, industrial concept that clearly reflects the group’s hard, get-down-to-business image. We’re loving their no frills, simple style of black wifebeaters paired with classic Timberlands, which, thankfully,  doesn’t take away from the colorful production’s graffiti-heavy setting. The song’s strong urban sound is further enhanced by some impressive breakdancing and step dance moves, making B.A.P quite the versatile group." Nancy Lee of Enews World commented "It appears [that] B.A.P has set out to differentiate itself among the pretty-boy male idol groups currently dominating the K-Pop world with a tough, bad boy image, smashing car windows, kicking up dirt and, you know, doing as boys do." iTunes wrote "The title track sounds like something straight out of Step Up 3D, with gigantic drums, walls of synths, and a whistle punctuating the whole song" Yun Seong Yeol of Star News Korea wrote, "The title song "Warrior" contains lyrics that criticize the current social system, which might be unfamiliar to many people who are used to today's friendly boy groups. Excluding all electronic sounds, which are often used in many K-pop songs, they highlight hip-hop beats". Seo Mi-Yeon of TV Report Korea wrote, "'Warrior' has a fast, strong beat and its fantastic stage performance leaves an impression. This song credits those who live in the darkness of suicide, violence at school and others by comparing them to warriors.

Chart performance 
On January 28, 2012, "Warrior" debuted at number fifty-four on the Gaon Music Chart. The following week, the song jumped ten places and peaked at number forty-four. On the Gaon Streaming Chart, "Warrior" debuted at number eighty-three and peaked at number fifty-one. On the Gaon Digital Chart the song debuted at number eighty-five and peaked at number forty-six. In Chart Korea the song debuted at number nineteen and peaked at number thirteen during the week of February 20, 2012.

Promotions
B.A.P first performed "Warrior" on Music Bank on January 27, 2012, followed by a debut stage on Show! Music Core, on MTV's The Show and on Inkigayo. On January 28, 2012, B.A.P performed the song on their debut showcase in Seoul, when 3,000 fans attended the show. On February 23, 2012, TS Entertainment announced that B.A.P would end the promotion for "Warrior" and would promote "Secret Love" the following week.

Each member gave a different ending for each live performance. It began with the youngest, Zelo, who displayed a scene of being shot by the rest of the members. Next was Himchan who collapsed in the hands of leader Yongguk. During B.A.P's fourth week of performing "Warrior", the lead vocalist, Daehyun, ended the performance while during the most recent live performance, Yongguk delivered an electrifying ending.

Music video
The shoot for the music video took place for a full four days on sets in Namyangju and Ilsan, and the video let loose the members' appeal and performances on a large-scale set. Director Hong Won-ki, who worked on videos for Girls' Generation's "The Boys", Seo Taiji's "Moai" and Beast's "Shock", directed the video.

Track listing
Korean Single:

Credits and personnel 
These credits were adapted from Warrior liner notes.

 Bang Yong-guk – vocals, rap, writing
 Zelo – vocals, rap
 Kim Him-chan – vocals
 Jung Dae-hyun – vocals
 Yoo Young-jae – vocals
 Moon Jong-up – vocals
 Kang Ji-won – writing, producing
 Kim Ki-bum – writing, producing

Charts

Release history

References

External links
 
 
 

B.A.P (South Korean band) songs
2012 songs
Korean-language songs